Coptops rufa is a species of beetle in the family Cerambycidae. It was described by James Thomson in 1878. It is known from the Andaman and Nicobar Islands.

References

rufa
Beetles described in 1878